Vidradne is a rural settlement (a selyshche) in the Zaporizhzhia Raion (district) of Zaporizhzhia Oblast in southern Ukraine. Its population was 1,375 in the 2001 Ukrainian Census. Administratively, it belongs to the Avhustynivka Rural Council, a local government area.

References

Zaporizhzhia Raion
Rural settlements in Zaporizhzhia Oblast
Populated places established in 1930
Populated places established in the Ukrainian Soviet Socialist Republic